The Manila Beer Brewmasters were a professional basketball team in the Philippine Basketball Association (PBA) from 1984-1986. It was formed after Basic Holdings, Inc., a company controlled by Lucio Tan, acquired the PBA franchise of Delta Motor Corporation, owner of league pioneer Toyota. The team was named after the brands of Asia Brewery, Inc., another Tan company - Beer Hausen (1984) and Manila Beer (1985-1986).

Beer Hausen intended to make Ramon Fernandez its franchise player with Jaworski relegated in the background. It acquired seven players from the Toyota team. Robert Jaworski refused to be a part of the new team, describing the sale as a 'farce,' and that players should not be sold "por kilo" ("lock, stock and barrel" or sold like cattle). Jaworski, Francis Arnaiz, Arnie Tuadles, Chito Loyzaga and Abe King refused to join Beer Hausen. Then-PBA president Carlos "Honeyboy" Palanca III offered to take in Jaworski and Arnaiz to his team, Gilbey's Gin; Tuadles and Loyzaga joined Great Taste and King joined Gold Eagle Beer. This marked the beginning of the Jaworski-Fernandez rivalry and directly contributed at being the cornerstone in making the Gins arguably the most popular team in Philippine basketball history with Jaworski at the forefront.

In the team's inaugural season, Ramon Fernandez achieved more than 20 triple-double performances, won his second MVP and led his team to a runner-up finish in the 1984 PBA Second All-Filipino Conference, losing to Great Taste via three-game sweep.

The following year, the ballclub was renamed Manila Beer and they bolstered their lineup through the acquisition of Crispa players Atoy Co, Yoyoy Villamin and Matthew Gaston. On October 1, 1985, three weeks into the Third Conference, Fernandez was traded to Tanduay for Abet Guidaben. Manila Beer made it to the finals for the second time in the 1985 PBA Reinforced Conference but were swept in four games in the best of seven series against guest team Northern Consolidated (NCC).

The year 1986 saw the Brewmasters having a new coach in national team mentor Joe Lipa. Manila Beer failed to make past eliminations and Lipa was replaced by Tito Eduque in the following conference. The Brewmasters were powered by imports Michael Young and Harold Keeling in the Third Conference and went all the way to the finals and placed second to Ginebra San Miguel, which had the super import tandem of Billy Ray Bates and Michael Hackett.

In January 1987, the franchise announced its disbandment. The Lucio Tan group would return to the PBA in 1999 with the second incarnation of Tanduay.

Trivia
In their first season, the Brewmasters had seven former Toyota players and two players 
namely Itoy Esguerra and Ramon Cruz, who were acquired from Crispa. In their third and final season, the team had six players from Crispa's 1983 grandslam team and two former players from Toyota, Edgardo Cordero and Tim Coloso, from their roster. Esguerra, Cruz, Cordero and Coloso are the only four players who completed three seasons with the ballclub.

While teams that disbanded would either placed last or were booted out of the semifinals in their last conference, only Manila Beer and the legendary Crispa Redmanizers ends up a losing finalist in their final PBA conference.

Season-by-season records

Notable players
Members of PBA Hall of Fame and PBA 25 Greatest Players are in boldface.

Ramon Fernandez - #10 center-forward
Alberto "Abet" Guidaben - #55/#5 center
Lim Eng Beng - guard
Fortunato "Atoy" Co, Jr - #6 guard
Nicanor "Nick" Bulaong - #20/#19 forward
Emerito "Emer" Legaspi - #18 guard
Leopoldo "Pol" Herrera - #14 forward
Edgardo Cordero - #3 forward
Ricardo "Ricky" Relosa - #15 center-forward
Timoteo "Tim" Coloso - #32 guard-forward
Elpidio "Yoyoy" Villamin - #13 forward-center
Mon Cruz - #24 guard
Mike Bilbao - #34 guard
Rodolfo "Rudy" Lalota - #9 center
Gary Vargas - #11 forward
Matthew "Fritz" Gaston - #22 guard
Abet Gutierrez - #13 - guard
Vic Sanchez - #12 - forward
Angelito "Itoy" Esguerra - #16  -guard-forward
Roberto "Bert" Dela Rosa - #7 - guard
Eddie Boy Mendoza - #17
Ricardo Cui
Tito Varela
Ranulfo Robles
Adonis Tierra
Jesus Migalbin

Imports

William 'Butch' Hays - 84 3rd Conference - 86 Reinforced
Doug Harris - 85 Open
Lewis Brown - 85 Open (replaced Harris)
Francoise Wise - 85 Reinforced; lost to NCC in the finals
George Turner / Carlton Cooper - 86 Reinforced
Michael Young / Harold Keeling - 86 Open; lost to Ginebra in the finals

See also
Tanduay Rhum Makers
Stag Pale Pilseners
Cossack Blue Spirits
Cobra Energy Drink Iron Men
Boracay Rum Waves/Tanduay Light Rhum Masters

References

 
Basketball teams established in 1984
Defunct Philippine Basketball Association teams
Sports clubs disestablished in 1986
1984 establishments in the Philippines
1986 disestablishments in the Philippines